Sangkhla Buri is a district (amphoe) in Kanchanaburi province in western Thailand.

Geography
Sangkhla Buri is in the far west of the province, on the Myanmar border. Three Pagodas Pass is the border crossing station to Myanmar. A large part of the district is covered by the Khao Laem Reservoir, an artificial lake formed by the Vajiralongkorn Dam on the Khwae Noi River.

Neighboring jurisdictions are (from the west clockwise) Tanintharyi Division, Mon State and Kayin State of Myanmar, Umphang district of Tak province, and Thong Pha Phum district of Kanchanaburi.

History
In 1939 the district Wang Ka (วังกะ) was renamed Sangkhla Buri, which was previously the name of the minor district Thong Pha Phum. On 20 May 1941 the district was downgraded to a minor district (king amphoe) and made a subordinate of Thong Pha Phum District. It then consisted of the four tambons: Nong Lu, Prangphle, Laiwo, and Lang Phu Sa. It was again upgraded to full district status on 27 July 1965.

Administration
The district is divided into three subdistricts (tambons), which are further subdivided into 20 villages (mubans). Wang Ka is a township (thesaban tambon) and covers parts of tambon Nong Lu. There are a further three tambon administrative organizations (TAO).

Uttamanusorn Bridge

A 2014 Bangkok Post article said that the "Uttamanusorn Bridge, better known as Saphan Mon,...built almost 30 years ago by the people, for the people of Ban Wangka, a Mon village" is the most popular tourist landmark in the district".

References

External links

amphoe.com

Sangkhla Buri
Myanmar–Thailand border crossings